Edward Berry (1768–1831) was a Royal Navy officer.

Edward Berry may also refer to:
Edward Berry (actor) (1706–1760), British stage actor
Edward Berry (soldier) (died 1920), Canadian Rhodes Scholar
Edward Elhanan Berry (1861–1931), English diplomat
Edward Fleetwood Berry (1817–1875), Anglican priest in Ireland
Edward W. Berry (1875–1945), American paleontologist and botanist
Ed Berry (born 1963), former defensive back in the National Football League

See also
Ted Berry (1905–2000), American politician
Ted Berry (basketball) (born 1972), American basketball player
Edward Bury (disambiguation)